Mahmoud Ghandi (August 25, 1945 in Tehran – June 28, 1981) was an Iranian politician, who served as the  Minister of Information and Communications Technology from 1979 to 1981. Ghandi was assassinated along with more than 70 members of the Islamic Republic Party on 28 June 1981.

See also 
 Hafte Tir bombing

References

Islamic Republican Party politicians
People assassinated by the People's Mojahedin Organization of Iran
Iranian terrorism victims
1945 births
1981 deaths